Kipyegon Bett (born 1 February 1998) is a Kenyan middle-distance runner specializing in the 800 metres. Bett won the 800 metres at the 2016 World U20 Championships in Bydgoszcz, Poland. He also came second in the 800 metres at the 2015 World Youth Championships in Cali, Colombia. In the second meet of the 2017 IAAF Diamond League in Shanghai, Bett won the 800m event in 1:44.70.

He won the bronze medal in the 800 metres at the 2017 World Championships held in London.

He tested positive for EPO in 2018 and received a four-year ban in November.

Competition record

References

External links

1998 births
Living people
Kenyan male middle-distance runners
Place of birth missing (living people)
World Athletics Championships athletes for Kenya
World Athletics Championships medalists
Kenyan sportspeople in doping cases